Universal Channel was a Japanese television channel.

History

2008-2010
Sci-Fi Channel was a Japanese television channel that operated from 1 April 2008 to 1 April 2010.

This was the result of an agreement between NBC Universal and Jupiter Telecommunications for NBC Universal to acquire Jupiter Telecommunications' subsidiary company JSBC2 and launch Sci Fi Channel on J:COM.  Under the terms of the agreement, NBC Universal acquired 100% of the equity of JSBC2, which held the broadcasting license for Reality TV on the SKY PerfecTV! platform in Japan.

Sci-Fi Channel was rebranded in the US on July 7, 2009 as Syfy as part of a global rebrand. Sci-Fi Channel in Japan did not adopt it because it was rebranded in the merger with Universal Channel. Sci-Fi occupies a programming block on Universal Channel. The channel's website no longer exists, instead redirecting to The Universal Channel's website.

2010
On April 1, 2010, Sci-Fi Channel (Japan) was rebranded into Universal Channel (Japan); a Syfy programming block later premiered.

See also
 Universal Channel
 Universal Channel Greece
 Universal Channel (Australia)

References

External links
Universal Channel Official site

NBCUniversal networks
Television stations in Japan
Japanese-language television stations
Television channels and stations established in 2008
Television channels and stations disestablished in 2013
Mass media in Osaka